Gilda's may refer to:

 Gildas
 Gilda's Club
 Gilda's Italian Restaurant, Portland, Oregon, U.S.